Smidts is a surname. Notable people with the surname include:

 Ale Smidts (born 1958), Dutch organizational theorist
 Rudi Smidts (born 1963), Belgian football defender

See also
 Smidt